Nokia 1600 is a part of Nokia's Ultrabasic series of mobile phones announced on June 2, 2005 along with the Nokia 1110, and released in late 2005. The 1600 is designed for prepaid mobile phone services and is related to Nokia 1110. It is notable in that it was originally released specifically to be used by customers in developing countries. The phone is noted for its durability and resilience to accidental drops. It sold 130 million units in its lifespan, making it one of the most successful phones to date.

Additional features 
Nokia 1600 has a speaking clock, which was a novel feature when the phone was launched in 2005. A user could use the speaking clock by pressing the asterisk ("*") button during the display of the home screen.

The device also includes a ringtone composer which allows creating custom ringtones. Pre-composed ringtones can be transferred through a data cable.

The phone menu features animated icons. There are fourteen pre-defined themes with fourteen wallpapers and menu backgrounds.

The phone has a basic calculator which can perform addition, subtraction, multiplication, and division.

Games 
The games available on the Nokia 1600 differ from country to country:

References

External links 

 Nokia 1600 User Manual

1600
Mobile phones introduced in 2005
Mobile phones with user-replaceable battery